{{DISPLAYTITLE:C2H3NO4}}
The molecular formula C2H3NO4 (molar mass: 105.05 g/mol, exact mass: 105.0062 u) may refer to:

 Acetyl nitrate
 Nitroacetic acid